The Ares Borghese is a Roman marble statue of the imperial era (1st or 2nd century AD).  It is 2.11m high.  It is identifiable as Ares by the helmet and by the ankle ring given to him by his lover Aphrodite.  This statue possibly preserves some features of an original work in bronze, now lost, of the 5th century BC.

The cult and representation of Ares are very rare in the ancient Greek world, especially in sculpture.  It has been thought that this statue may be derived from one by Alcamenes, an Athenian sculptor who, according to Pausanias (I, 8, 4), made a statue of Ares that was erected on the Athenian agora.  However, the temple of Ares to which he refers had only been moved from Acharnes and re-sited in the Agora in Augustus's time, making this a chronological impossibility.  Also, statues known to derive from Alcamenes' statue show the god in a breastplate (one is depicted in this relief).  So, in all, this statue may not be a copy of Alcamenes's, but instead a Roman creation according to a classicising or Neo-Attic type.

Later, widely dispersed, this type was paired with female statues of the Venus de Milo type for portraits of the imperial Roman couple, symbol of the union between military and peace, such as the Mars and Venus.  Formerly part of the Borghese collection, it was purchased from there in 1807 by Napoleon.

Popular culture
The statue is present (as a bust) in the anime Sekko Boys.

Gallery

External links

 3D model of head of Ares Borghese via photogrammetric survey of a plaster cast of the Munich Glyptothek's bust
Louvre catalogue
Skulpturhalle Basel

Borghese antiquities
Antiquities acquired by Napoleon
Ancient Greek and Roman sculptures of the Louvre
Roman copies of 5th-century BC Greek sculptures
Marble sculptures
Archaeological discoveries in Italy